Pedro S. Cayco (born 10 May 1932) is a retired swimmer who competed at the 1956 Summer Olympics at the Men's 100 metre backstroke event. His older brother Jacinto was also an Olympic swimmer.

References

External links
 

Living people
Filipino male swimmers
Olympic swimmers of the Philippines
Swimmers at the 1956 Summer Olympics
1932 births